A nanny is a child's caregiver.

Nanny may also refer to:
 A female goat
 A Cajun word for godmother (see godparent)
 An affectionate term for grandmother

Places
 Nanny (river), a watercourse in Ireland

People
 Nanny of the Maroons, 18th-century leader of the Jamaican Maroons
 Nanny Still (1926—2009), Finnish designer
 Édouard Nanny (1872–1942), double bass player, teacher, and composer

Art, entertainment, and media

Fictional characters
See Nanny, Fictional representations

Films
The Nanny (1965 film), a 1965 British suspense film starring Bette Davis (based on Merriam Modell's novel)
The Nanny (1999 film), a 1999 Italian film
The Manny, a 2015 German film
Nanny (film), a 2022 American horror film

Literature
 "Nanny" (short story), 1955 science fiction short story by Philip K. Dick
The Nanny (1964), novel by Merriam Modell (writing as Evelyn Piper)
 The Nanny (Nathan novel), 2003 novel by Melissa Nathan

Television

Series
 Nanny (TV series), a 1981–83 British drama series starring Wendy Craig
 Nanny 911, an American reality television show 
Supernanny, a UK television reality TV programme
Take Home Nanny, an hour-long reality television show that originally aired on TLC
The Nanny, a 1993–99 American sitcom starring Fran Drescher
"The Nanny" (The Nanny episode), the sitcom's pilot episode

Brands and products
 Nanny software, a general term for parental control and content restriction software

Politics 
 Nanny state

See also
Nannie